Grrr or grr is an onomatopoeia for growling and may refer to:

Music
 Grrr Records, a French avant-garde jazz record label
 "Grrrr" (song), a 2009 song by David Guetta

Albums
 Grrr... (Bishop Allen album) (2009)
 GRRR! It's Betty Boo, a 1992 album by Betty Boo
 Grrr (Cloroform album) (2016)
 Grrr (Hugh Masekela album) (1966)
 GRRR!, a 2012 compilation album by the Rolling Stones
 Grrr!, a 1992 album by  Lapinlahden Linnut
 ¡Grrrr!, a 2006 album by Moderatto

Other uses
 Grrr (play), a play by Dusty Hughes
 Grrr (advertisement), a 2004 British advertisement for Honda i-CDTi engines
 Grrrrrrrrrrr!!, a 1965 painting by Roy Lichtenstein
 Grrr!, a magazine of People for the Ethical Treatment of Animals
 Pink, Vol. 1: GRRR!, a 2004 art book by Scott Morse

See also
GRR (disambiguation)